‘O Pōrīnetia To Tātou ‘Ai‘a ("Polynesia, a Homeland for us all") was a French Polynesian anti-independence political party founded by Gaston Tong Sang on 1 October 2007 after he split from his former party, the Tāhō‘ēra‘a Huira‘atira. It had six members in the French Polynesian assembly, all former Taheora'a Huiraatira members.

It presented a joint list called "To Tātou ‘Ai‘a" (Homeland for us all) together with other autonomist parties in the January 2008 elections.

The party merged with others to form A Tia Porinetia ahead of the 2013 elections.

Notable people
Mita Teriipaia, French Polynesian minister for culture and the arts

References

Political parties in French Polynesia
Political parties established in 2007
2007 establishments in French Polynesia
2013 disestablishments in France